Paul Standfield (20 October 1916 – 5 October 2003) was an  Australian rules footballer who played with Footscray in the Victorian Football League (VFL).

Notes

External links 

1916 births
2003 deaths
Australian rules footballers from Victoria (Australia)
Western Bulldogs players